Oenomaus was a Gallic gladiator, who escaped from the gladiatorial school of Lentulus Batiatus in Capua. Together with Spartacus, Crixus, Castus, and Gannicus, he became one of the leaders of rebellious slaves during the Third Servile War (73–71 BC) 

Oenomaus was involved in one of the first major successes of the slave army, the rout of the army of the praetor Gaius Claudius Glaber, who had tried to lay siege to the slave army near Mount Vesuvius. 

Oenomaus fell in an early battle, possibly during the winter of 73–72 BC when the slave armies were plundering cities and towns in the south of Italy.

In popular culture
Oenomaus appears as a character in Jeff Wayne's Musical Version of Spartacus.
Oenomaus, depicted as a Numidian, is portrayed by Peter Mensah in the Starz television series Spartacus.
Oenomaus is the name of a gladiator-slave in the futuristic setting of Warhammer 40,000. Like the historical Oenomaus, he is a leader and organizes an uprising, dies significantly before the uprising ends, and is not the overall leader of the uprising.

References

Ancient sources
 Orosius, Histories 5.24.1-2
 Appian, Civil Wars 1.116
 Florus, Epitome 2.8.20

Secondary literature
 Bradley, Keith. Slavery and Rebellion in the Roman World. Bloomington: Indiana University Press, 1989. 

1st-century BC Romans
Celtic warriors
Gaulish people
Rebel slaves in ancient Rome
Roman gladiators
Third Servile War
70s BC deaths
Year of birth unknown
Spartacus